Rafael Trelles (born April 27, 1957) is a  postmodern artist from Puerto Rico.

Urban art

On Concrete (Urban Graphic in Buenos Aires) – Documentary (2007)
En Concreto (translates to On Concrete) is an artistic project of urban interventions developed by Rafael Trelles since the summer of 2004 on the walls, side walks and utility poles of several cities including the island of Vieques. It's an experimental graphic work originally designed for placing in abandoned sectors of worldwide cities. Proyecto 'ace traces and documents the development of this landmark public exhibition in the city of Buenos Aires into film.

Life and education
Rafael Trelles was born on April 27, 1957 in Santurce, Puerto Rico. He began  studying painting at the age of eleven, under the guidance of the Catalan painter, Julio Yort. In 1980, Trelles graduated from the University of Puerto Rico having obtained a Bachelor’s Degree in Fine Arts, Magna Cum Laude. In 1983, he pursued graduate studies at the National Autonomous University of Mexico (the National University of Mexico). At present, he resides and works in San Juan, Puerto Rico.

Individual exhibitions
2020 	The Imagined Word, drawing exhibition. Point of Contact Gallery, Syracuse University, Nueva York.
	
	    La palabra imaginada, exhibición de dibujos. Museo de Las Américas, San Juan Puerto Rico.

2018 	Santurce, un libro mural, Puerto Rico Museum of Contemporary Art. Santurce, Puerto Rico.

2015 	Flora, un encuentro con las acuarelas de Agustín Stahl.  San Juan Bautista Gallery, San Juan, Puerto Rico.

2013 	Samsa, digital photography; sala Aljibe, Carmen de la Victoria, Granada, España.

2012 	Intersections, new paintings, Bayamón Museum of Art, Puerto Rico.

2011 	Intersections, new paintings, Taller Puertorriqueño, Philadelphia, Pennsylvania, USA

	    En concreto, gráfica urbana  (In Concrete, Urban Graphics), presentation of  portfolios and 6 documentaries. Colegio de Arquitectos y Arquitectos Paisajistas 	de Puerto Rico, Santurce, Puerto Rico.

2009 	Samsa, digital photography. Puerto Rico Museum of Contemporary Art. Santurce, Puerto Rico.

2007 	Figuraciones sobre plástico (Representations in Plastic), exhibition of drawings. Galería 356, San Juan Puerto Rico, (shared hall with María Antonia Ordoñez).

	    En concreto, gráfica urbana en Buenos Aires (In Concrete, Urban Graphics in Buenos Aires), Proyecto Ace, Buenos Aires Argentina. Resident Artist, urban 	interventions and exhibitions.

	    Performance Autorretrato según Paret, carta a un Presidente (Self-Portrait 	According to Paret, Letter to a President). Plaza de la Convalecencia, Río Piedras, Puerto Rico.

 	    En concreto, gráfica urbana en Vieques (In Concrete, Urban Graphics in 	Vieques), presentation of portfolio of digital graphics.  Fuerte del Conde Mirasol, 	Vieques, Puerto Rico.

2006 	En concreto, gráfica urbana en Vieques (In Concrete, Urban Graphics in 	Vieques), presentation of portfolio of digital graphics. Raúl Juliá Theater, Puerto 	Rico Museum of Art, Santurce, Puerto Rico.
 
	    En concreto (gráfica urbana en Mayagüez) (In Concrete, Urban Graphics in 	Mayagüez), Parque de los Próceres, Mayagüez, Puerto Rico. Urban interventions, 	showing of documentary, conference.

	    Performance En concreto (gráfica urbana en el Ponce Art Museum), (In 	Concrete, Urban Graphics in the Ponce Museum of Art), sidewalk, Ponce 	Museum of Art. Project Círculo del Arte, Ponce, Puerto Rico.

2005 	Installation and Performance  Natividad (Nativity), Galería Sin Título, San Juan, 	Puerto Rico.

	    Performance En concreto (gráfica urbana en Vieques), (In Concrete, Urban 	Graphics in Vieques), land formerly belonging to the Navy,  Vieques, Puerto 	Rico.

	    Exhibition En concreto (gráfica urbana), (In Concrete, Urban Graphics), Conde 	de Mirasol Museum, Vieques, Puerto Rico.

	    Exhibition En Concreto (gráfica urbana), (In Concrete, Urban Graphics), Galería 	Botello, Hato Rey, Puerto Rico.

2004 	Exhibition En Concreto (gráfica urbana) (In Concrete, Urban Graphics), Gallery 	of Universidad del Sagrado Corazón (Sacred Heart University), Santurce, Puerto 	Rico.

2003 	Exhibition of paintings, Poliedro (Polyhedron), Puerto Rico Museum of Art, San 	Juan, Puerto Rico.

2001 	Exhibition of paintings Crónicas del Asombro (Chronicles of Wonder), Banco 	Bilbao Vizcaya, Old San Juan, Puerto Rico

2000 	Installation Visitas al Velorio, Museo de San Juan, San Juan, Puerto Rico

1999 	Exhibition of painting, Elite Fine Arts Gallery, Miami, Florida, United States

1997 	Exhibition of paintings Paisaje Secreto (Secret Landscape), Ponce Museum of 	Art, Ponce, Puerto Rico.

	    Exhibition of paintings, Elite Fine Arts Gallery, Miami, Florida, United States.

1996 	Installation Visitas al Velorio, Ponce Museum of History, Ponce, Puerto Rico.

1993 	Exhibition of paintings, El Jardín del Poeta (The Poet’s Garden), Galería Botello, 	San Juan, Puerto Rico.

1992 	Exhibition of drawings, Puerto Rico Museum of Contemporary Art, Edificio 	Centro Europa, Santurce, Puerto Rico.

1991 	Installation Visitas al Velorio, Museum of History, Anthropology and Art, 	University of Puerto Rico, Río Piedras, Puerto Rico.

1990 	Exhibition of paintings and drawings, Gallery Renaissance III, New Jersey, 	United States.

1989 	Exhibition of drawings Casa Fleming, 15to. Festival del Café (15th Coffee 	Festival), Yauco,  Puerto Rico.

	    Exhibition of drawings, Library of the Colegio Universitario de Humacao, 	Humacao, Puerto Rico.

1988 	Exhibition of African-American drawings, Centro Universitario, University of 	Puerto Rico, Río Piedras, Puerto Rico.

	    Exhibition of drawings, Librería Hermes, Condado, San Juan, Puerto Rico.

1987 	Exhibition of drawings, Un camino hacia la magia (One Step Toward Magic), Art 	League, San Juan, Puerto Rico.

1986 	Exhibition of paintings, El tarot del universo (Universal Tarot), Café Teatro El 	Aquisitio, Santa Cruz de Tenerife, Canary Islands, Spain..

1985 	Exhibition of Paintings, Drawings, and Lithography, Edificio del Laboratorio de 	Pantomima, San Ángel, Universidad Autónoma de México, Mexico City.

1983 	Exhibition of Paintings, Drawings, and Lithography, Galería Guatibirí, Río 	Piedras, Puerto Rico.

1982 	Exhibition of Paintings, Drawings, and Lithography, Galería Guatibirí, Río 	Piedras, Puerto Rico.

1979 	Exhibition of drawings, Francisco Oller Gallery, University of Puerto Rico, Río 	Piedras, Puerto Rico.

Awards
2011 	Culture Medal, Alegría Foundation, Dr. Ricardo Alegría. San Juan Puerto Rico.
2009  	Premio Innovación y Cambio en la Educación Superior, Curso Humanidades en 	Acción. Otorgado por el Centro para la Excelencia Académica (Innovation and 	Change in Higher Education Award, Humanities in Action.

        Awarded by the 	Center for Academic Excellence), University of Puerto Rico, Río Piedras.

2008 	Prize for Best Exhibition of 2007, Asociación de Críticos de Puerto Rico (Puerto 	Rico Critics Association).
2005 	Prize for Best Exhibition of 2004 in Contemporary Mediums, Asociación de 	Críticos de Puerto Rico (Puerto Rico Critics Association).
1998  	Art Medal granted by the Asociación Puertorriqueña de Artistas Plásticos (Puerto 	Rican Artists Association), affiliated with UNESCO.
1996  	"Premio al Mérito, por la excelencia en su trayectoria artístico-cultural." (Prize for 	Artistic Excellence), Fondo Nacional para el Financiamiento del Quehacer 	Cultural de Puerto Rico (Puerto Rican National                      Fund for the Financing of Cultural 	Activities).
1992  	Prize granted by the Puerto Rico Critics Association for the Best Installation of 	1991.
1986 	First prize in the drawing category in the competition sponsored by Revista Sin 	Nombre, Puerto Rico.
1981  	First prize in the painting category in the competition sponsored by Revista Sin 	Nombre, Puerto Rico.

External links
 Proyecto 'ace
 https://octobergallery.co.uk/artists/trelles
 https://www.lartban.com

1957 births
Living people
Postmodern artists
People from Santurce, Puerto Rico
University of Puerto Rico alumni
National Autonomous University of Mexico alumni
Puerto Rican artists